Pioneer-Pleasant Vale Schools is a school district in Garfield County, Oklahoma. The district consists of two schools, Pioneer High School in an unincorporated area (with a Waukomis address but not in Waukomis, grades 7–12) and Pleasant Vale Elementary (grades PK-6) in Enid.

The district boundary includes much of eastern Enid.

References

School districts in Oklahoma
Schools in Enid, Oklahoma
Education in Garfield County, Oklahoma
School districts established in 1892